The Macao Public Library is the public library system of Macau. The head office is on the ground floor of the old building of the Sir Robert Ho Tung Library in São Lourenço (Saint Lawrence Parish).

History

On 24 September 2019, the  opened. It is located at the Community Complex of the Seac Pai Van public housing estate in Coloane.

The Wong Ieng Kuan Library in Taipa, which opened in 2005, closed on 1 January 2022. It was located inside the Luís de Camões Garden.

Libraries
The libraries of the Macao Public Library system include the following:

Central District:
 Macao Central Library – São Lázaro
 Library in Ho Yin Garden – Sé

North District (all in Nossa Senhora de Fátima):
 Ilha Verde Library
 Mong Há Library
 Wong Ieng Kuan Library in 
 Wong Ieng Kuan Children's Library in Areia Preta Urban Park
 Wong Ieng Kuan Library in Dr. Sun Yat-Sen Municipal Park

Southern District (all in São Lourenço):
 Sir Robert Ho Tung Library
 S. Lourenço Library

Western District (all in Santo António):
 Patane Library
 Red Market Library
 Wong Ieng Kuan Library in Luis de Camões Garden

Taipa and Coloane:
 Taipa Library
 Coloane Library
 Seac Pai Van Library

References

External links

 
 Macao Public Library  
 Macao Public Library 
 Macao Public Library 

Libraries in Macau
Public libraries in China